The 2001 World Music Awards (13th Annual World Music Awards) were held in the Sporting Club, Monaco on May 2, 2001. The World Music Awards recognise the best selling artists around the world based on statistics supplied by the International Federation of Phonographic Industries (IFPI). The show was later broadcast by ABC on May 28, 2001. The show was hosted by actress Carmen Electra and R&B artist Sisqo. Proceeds from ticket sales to the show go to a Monaco-based children’s charity Monaco Aide Presence whose patron, Prince Albert, is also patron of the World Music Awards. Performers included Ricky Martin, Christina Aguilera, Enya, Nelly, Rod Stewart, Anastacia, Aqua, Yannick, Peter Maffay, Alsou, Cheb Mami, Samira Said, Razan and Julio Iglesias Jr.


Winners

Dance
World's Best Selling Dance Artist: Ricky Martin
World's Best Selling Dance Group: Vengaboys

Latin
World's Best Selling Female Latin Artist: Christina Aguilera
World's Best Selling Latin Group: Santana
World's Best Selling Male Latin Artist: Ricky Martin

New
World's Best Selling New Female Pop Artist: Anastacia
World's Best Selling New Rap Artist: Nelly

New Age
World's Best Selling New Age Artist: Enya

Pop
World's Best Selling Female Pop Artist: Britney Spears
World's Best Selling Male Pop Artist: Ricky Martin
World's Best Selling Pop Group: Backstreet Boys

Pop/Rock
The World's Best Selling Pop/Rock Group: Beatles

Rap
World's Best Selling Rap Artist: Eminem

Rock
World's Best Selling Rock Group: Santana

R&B
World's Best Selling R&B Male Artist: Sisqo

Regional Awards
Best Selling African Artist: Yannick
Best Selling Arab Artist: Cheb Mami
Best Selling Japanese Artist: Ayumi Hamasaki  
Best Selling Australian Artist: Zulya Kamalova 
Best Selling Australian Group: Savage Garden  
Best Selling Belgian Artist: Lara Fabian
Best Selling British Group: The Beatles
Best Selling Female British Artist: Sonic Youth 
Best Selling Chinese Artist: Elva  
Best Selling French Solo Artist: Helene Segara
Best Selling German Artist: Peter Maffay
Best Selling German Group: Pur  
Best Selling Irish Artist: Enya
Best Selling Italian Artist: Eros Ramazzotti
Best Selling Russian Artist: Alsou
Best Selling Russian Group: B2  
Best Selling Scandinavian Artist: Aqua
Best Selling Swiss Artist: Gola

Diamond Award
The Diamond Award honors those incredibly successful recording-artists who have sold over 100 million albums during their career.  This is the first year that this award was presented.
Rod Stewart

References

External links
World Music Awards 2001 (Archived 2009-10-22) fan site with notes from the show.
Lara Fabie singing Adaigo at the 2001 World Music Awards.

World Music Awards, 2001
Lists of World Music Award winners